The 114th Pennsylvania House of Representatives District is located in Lackawanna County and includes the following areas:

 Carbondale 
 Carbondale Township
 Clarks Summit
 Dickson City
 Fell Township
 Glenburn Township
 Greenfield Township
 Jermyn
 Mayfield
 Moosic
 Newton Township
 North Abington Township
 Old Forge
 Ransom Township
 Scott Township
 Taylor 
 Vandling
 Waverly Township

Representatives

References

Government of Lackawanna County, Pennsylvania
114